No. 288 Squadron RAF was a Royal Air Force Squadron formed as an anti-aircraft co-operation unit in World War II.

History

Formation in World War II
The squadron formed at  RAF Digby on 17 November 1941 and was equipped with   Lysanders, Blenheims and  Hurricanes  to provide practice for the anti-aircraft defences in Lincolnshire and Yorkshire by towing targets and conducting simulated attacks. The squadron then moved to Wellingore, Church Fenton and Hutton Cranswick with detachments at other bases and operated other aircraft types before it was disbanded at East Moor on 15 June 1946.

Postwar
The squadron reformed at Middle Wallop on 15 March 1953 and operated Spitfire and Balliol target aircraft before it disbanded again on 30 September 1957.

Aircraft operated

References

External links
 History of No.'s 286–290 Squadrons at RAF Web
 288 Squadron history on the official RAF website

288
Military units and formations established in 1941